The Alliance for Change is a political party in the Chinese Special Administrative Region of Macau. In the 2009 legislative election, the party won 5.54 percent of the popular vote and 1 of the 12 popularly elected seats.

Elected members
 Melinda Chan, 2009–present

Political parties in Macau
Conservative parties in China